Dimitrie Cariagdi (1815–October 9, 1894) was a Romanian politician.

He studied in his native country, completing his education at the University of Paris. Returning home in 1838, Cariagdi joined the magistracy, eventually becoming state's attorney. In June 1865, after several years of political involvement, he was named Justice Minister under Nicolae Crețulescu, serving until the following February. In December 1870, he took on the same role under Ion Ghica, remaining until March 1871. He served numerous terms as deputy and senator.

Cariagdi joined the National Liberal Party. In December 1878, he was elected Mayor of Bucharest. His chief achievement was a public works project for managing the Dâmbovița River. He served until 1883.

Notes

1815 births
1894 deaths
University of Paris alumni
19th-century Romanian lawyers
Romanian prosecutors
National Liberal Party (Romania) politicians
Members of the Chamber of Deputies (Romania)
Members of the Senate of Romania
Romanian Ministers of Justice
Mayors of Bucharest
Romanian expatriates in France